David Paul Wainhouse (born November 7, 1967) is a Canadian former professional baseball player who pitched for seven seasons in Major League Baseball. A right-hander, Wainhouse was primarily a middle reliever.

Amateur career
Wainhouse attended Mercer Island High School in Mercer Island, Washington, where he played varsity baseball in his senior year. He attended college at Washington State, where he joined the baseball squad as a walk-on. Wainhouse had a strong season in his junior year, finishing with a 7–0 record.

The Montreal Expos selected Wainhouse with their first-round pick of the 1988 Major League Baseball Draft, making him the first Canadian-born player picked the first round as well as the highest-ever pick out of Washington State.

Later that summer, prior to making his professional debut, Wainhouse was named to the Canada's Olympic baseball team. At the Seoul Games, baseball was a demonstration event. Canada finished the preliminary round with a 1–2 record and failed to qualify for the medal round.

Professional career
The  season saw Wainhouse start with the Harrisburg Senators of the Double-A Eastern League, get promoted to the Triple-A Indianapolis Indians and, as a September call-up, see a two-game stint in Montreal.

That offseason, the Expos traded him to the Seattle Mariners (along with Kevin Foster) for Frank Bolick and a player to be named later. He only appeared in three games for the Mariners at the start of the  season before getting demoted to the minors.

He spent the following season in the minor league systems of the Toronto Blue Jays and Florida Marlins, failing to return to the majors until , with the Pittsburgh Pirates. At the end of the 1997 campaign, Wainhouse signed with the Colorado Rockies. Just as he did in Pittsburgh, Wainhouse spent  and  shuttling between the major league club and their Triple-A farm team, this time the Colorado Springs Sky Sox.

He appeared in nine games with the Cardinals before an injury ended his season.

Wainhouse retired after the  season. In a seven-season major league career, he compiled a career record of 2–3 in 85 games with an ERA of 7.37. Wainhouse now lives in Kent, Washington with his wife and two children. He currently operates a baseball academy and has been named as the assistant coach of the Seattle University Redhawks baseball program.

References

External links

1967 births
Baseball players from Toronto
Baseball players at the 1988 Summer Olympics
Calgary Cannons players
Canadian expatriate baseball players in the United States
Colorado Springs Sky Sox players
Living people
Major League Baseball players from Canada
Major League Baseball pitchers
Montreal Expos players
Seattle Mariners players
Pittsburgh Pirates players
Colorado Rockies players
St. Louis Cardinals players
Indianapolis Indians players
West Palm Beach Expos players
Iowa Cubs players
Memphis Redbirds players
Harrisburg Senators players
Syracuse Chiefs players
Portland Sea Dogs players
Carolina Mudcats players
Jacksonville Expos players
Seattle Redhawks baseball coaches
Olympic baseball players of Canada
Sportspeople from Kent, Washington
Washington State Cougars baseball players
Mercer Island High School alumni